Ben Eldridge, (born August 15, 1938) is a five-string banjo player and a founding member of the seminal bluegrass group The Seldom Scene. He also works as a mathematician.

Biography

Ben Eldridge was born in Richmond, Virginia. He began playing the guitar at age ten and later in 1954 the banjo. In 1957, he began his studies at the University of Virginia at Charlottesville. Four years later he moved to Adelphi, Maryland. Eldridge became acquainted with Bill Keith and Bill Emerson who were to become two major banjo picking influences in his life.

In June 1970, Eldridge joined "Cliff Waldron and his New Shades of Grass". Eldridge was among five musicians who started playing in the fall of 1971 with mandolinist John Duffey, Dobro player Mike Auldridge, bassist Tom Gray and guitar and lead singer John Starling. They would ultimately be known as The Seldom Scene. 

Eldridge plays on all Seldom Scene albums, and his discography includes 55 albums. Eldridge contributed to solo albums by Mike Auldridge and Phil Rosenthal, and he and other members of The Seldom Scene backed Linda Ronstadt in a few numbers on her early, more country-flavored albums.

Eldridge, the last original member of the Seldom Scene, announced his retirement January 15, 2016 after 44 years with the band.

He is the father of Chris Eldridge of Punch Brothers.

References

Living people
American banjoists
The Country Gentlemen members
Musicians from Richmond, Virginia
University of Virginia alumni
People from Adelphi, Maryland
1938 births
The Seldom Scene members